Dub Come Save Me is a remix album by English hip hop musician Roots Manuva. It is a re-working of his second studio album, Run Come Save Me. It was released on Big Dada in 2002.

Track listing

Charts

References

External links
 

2002 albums
Roots Manuva albums
Big Dada albums